Northern bluet is a common name for several damselflies and may refer to:

Enallagma annexum, native to North America
Enallagma cyathigerum, native to Europe